, formerly New Komeito and abbreviated NKP, is a conservative political party in Japan founded by lay members of the Buddhist Japanese new religious movement Soka Gakkai in 1964. Since 2012, it has served in government as the junior coalition partner of the Liberal Democratic Party. Natsuo Yamaguchi has been the president of the party since 8 September 2009 and currently serves as a member of the House of Councillors (the upper house) in the National Diet, the Japanese national legislature (elected in the 2019 Japanese House of Councillors election, constituency is Tokyo at-large district).

After the 2012 Japanese general election, the party held 31 seats in the lower house and 19 seats in the upper house. The number of lower house seats increased to 35 after the 2014 Japanese general election and to 25 seats in the upper house after winning 14 in the 2016 general election. In the 2017 Tokyo prefectural election, the party garnered a total of 23 seats, up one from the previously held 22 seats. It lost six seats, down to 29 seats in the lower house after the 2017 Japanese general election. In 2021 general election, the party later gained another 3 seats, an increase from 29 to 32 seats.

Platform
A self-proclaimed party of "humanitarian socialism," Komeito's declared mission is to pioneer "people-centered politics, a politics based on a humanitarianism, that treats human life with the utmost respect and care". On April 24, 2019, joint task force efforts with its coalition partner resulted in the passing of a bill mandating reparations and having the coalition government issue a formal apology to sterilization victims of the defunct Eugenics Protection Act, thus to advance human rights awareness in the wake of lawsuits related to the history of eugenics in Japan.

Domestically, the party proposals include reduction of the central government and bureaucracy, increased transparency in public affairs, and increased local (prefectural) autonomy with the private sector playing an increased role. In accordance with its public affairs transparency platform, it was reported that since September 2016, the Komeito conducted independent analyses for possible environmental contamination of the proposed Toyosu market site. The Komeito officially raised its environmental concerns later regarding Toyosu market during the October 5, 2016 Tokyo Metropolitan Assembly Session. In response, the newly appointed Tokyo Governor, Yuriko Koike, cited possible disciplinary action towards those responsible for the Toyosu project.

With regard to foreign policy, the Komeito wishes to eliminate nuclear arms and Japanese involvement in armed conflict in general. However, in July 2015, Komeito backed prime minister's Shinzo Abe's push for expanded military powers, although it did manage to moderate the policy. 

Religious scholar and political analyst Masaru Satō explains that in postwar Japan there were two major parties, the Liberal Democratic Party representing financial interests and large corporations and the Japan Socialist Party largely advocating the interests of trade unions and the working class. There was no single party that represented people who belonged to neither, such as shop owners and housewives, among others. Komeito was thus able to capture the support of this constituency.

Relationship with Soka Gakkai
Komeito regards the Soka Gakkai as a "major electoral constituency", having formally separated from the religious group and revised both its platform and regulations in 1970 to reflect a "secular orientation". Observers continue to describe Komeito as the Soka Gakkai's "political arm", however, and critics contend the relationship violates the separation of religion and politics enshrined in Article 20 of the Japanese Constitution. The leadership and financing of the two groups are currently said to be independent. Both groups report having occasional liaison meetings, characterizing them as informational and "open to the media". Numerous Japanese religious groups have established political parties in Japan, but statistics scholar Petter Lindgren states that "None have, however, been more successful than Soka Gakkai."

Party organ
The party organ of Komeito is the Komei Shinbun. It is published by the Komei Organ Paper Committee, and has also published a regional Hokkaido edition in the past.

Foreign policy 
The party promotes closer relations with China, earning it criticism from some hawkish members of the LDP.

History

Opposition before 1993
Komeito began as the Political Federation for Clean Government in 1961, but held its inaugural convention as Komeito on 17 November 1964. The three characters 公明党 have the approximate meanings of "public/government" (公 kō), "light/brightness" (明 mei), and "political party" (党 tō). The combination "kōmei" (公明) is usually taken to mean "justice".
Komeito's predecessor party, Kōmeitō, was formed in 1962, but it had begun in 1954 as the Kōmei Political League. It lasted until it merged with the NKP in 1998.

In 1957, a group of Young Men's Division members campaigning for a Soka Gakkai candidate in an Osaka Upper House by-election were arrested for distributing money, cigarettes, and caramels at supporters' residences, in violation of election law, and on July 3 of that year, at the beginning of an event memorialized as the "Osaka Incident," Daisaku Ikeda was arrested in Osaka. He was taken into custody in his capacity as Soka Gakkai's Youth Division Chief of Staff for overseeing activities that constituted violations of election law. He spent two weeks in jail and appeared in court forty-eight times before he was cleared of all charges in January 1962.

In 1968, fourteen of its members were convicted of forging absentee ballots in Shinjuku, and eight were sentenced to prison for electoral fraud. In the 1960s it was widely criticized for violating the separation of church and state, and in February 1970 all three major Japanese newspapers printed editorials demanding that the party reorganize. It eventually broke apart based on promises to segregate from Soka Gakkai.

In the 1980s Shimbun Akahata discovered that many Soka Gakkai members were rewarding acquaintances with presents in return for Komeito votes and that Okinawa residents had changed their addresses to elect Komeito politicians.

Anti-LDP coalition government: 1993–1994
Kōmeitō joined the Hosokawa and Hata anti-LDP coalition cabinets in 1993 and 1994. After the collapse of the anti-LDP and anti-JCP governments and the electoral and campaign finance reforms of 1994, the Kōmeitō split in December 1994: The  joined the New Frontier Party (NFP) a few days later in an attempt to unify the splintered opposition. The other group, continued to exist as a separate party. The Reimei Club merged into the New Peace Party a few weeks later in January 1998. Finally, in November 1998, Kōmei and New Peace Party merged to re-establish Kōmeitō (referred to in English now as "New Komeito" – the party's name is just Kōmeitō as before the 1994 split).

The Japan Echo alleged in 1999 that Soka Gakkai distributed fliers to local branches describing how to abuse the jūminhyō residence registration system in order to generate a large number of votes for Komeito candidates in specific districts.

Coalition with the Liberal Democratic Party: 1999–2009, 2012–present

The current conservative, more moderate, and centrist party was formed in 1998, in a merger of Kōmei and the New Peace Party. Since then it has joined coalition with the ruling Liberal Democratic Party (LDP), which need Komeito to maintain majority in the Diet (especially in the House of Councillors which the LDP lost majority since 1989), and did well in the 2000 and 2001 parliamentary elections.

The LDP-Liberal coalition expanded to include the New Komeito Party in October 1999. New Komeito has been (and continues to be) a coalition partner in the Government of Japan since 1999 (excluding 2009–2011 when the Democratic Party of Japan was in power). As such, New Komeito supported a (temporary) change to Japan's "no-war constitution" in order for Japan to support the 2003 invasion of Iraq.

In the 2003 Japanese general election and 2004 Japanese House of Councillors election, the NKP did well, thanks to an extremely committed and well-organized voter base coming from Soka Gakkai. The party shares its support base with the LDP, made up of white-collar bureaucrats and rural populations, but also gained support from religious leaders. However, on 27 July 2005, NKP's Secretary-General said that his party would consider forming a coalition government with the Democratic Party of Japan (DPJ) if the DPJ gained a majority in the House of Representatives. On 8 August 2005, then-Prime Minister and the president of LDP Junichiro Koizumi dissolved the Lower House and called for a general election, due to the rejection on some of the members of LDP for efforts to privatize Japan Post. The incumbent LDP-New Komeito coalition won a large majority in the 2005 general election.

Natsuo Yamaguchi became the party's leader on 8 September 2009 after the party and their coalition partner LDP suffered a major defeat in the 2009 general election, become part of the opposition for the first time since 1999. New Komeito lost ten seats, including that of party leader Akihiro Ota and general secretary Kazuo Kitagawa. On 8 September 2009, Yamaguchi replaced Ota as president of New Komeito.

In the general election on 16 December 2012, the LDP/Komeito coalition secured a supermajority and came back into government. The former party chief Akihiro Ota (Ohta) is currently Minister of Land, Infrastructure, Transport and Tourism. The party also gained seats in the general election in 2014. In September 2014 the party changed its English name from New Komeito back to Komeito.

In July 2015, Komeito backed Prime Minister Shinzō Abe's push to revise the Constitution in order to "give Japan's military limited powers to fight in foreign conflicts for the first time since World War II". This legislation, supported by the United States, would allow the "Self-Defense Forces to cooperate more closely with the U.S. by providing logistical support and, in certain circumstances, armed backup in international conflicts" and "complements guidelines in a bilateral agreement governing how Japanese and United States forces work together, which was signed by the two nations" earlier in 2015.

On March 11, 2019, a project team of Komeito submitted proposals to Foreign Minister Taro Kono for an international agreement to regulate robotic weapons, calling on Japan to build global consensus for a "political declaration or a code of conduct, within the framework of the Convention on Certain Conventional Weapons".

Leaders

Election results

House of Representatives

House of Councillors

See also
:Category:Komeito politicians
Christian democracy
Politics of Japan
Liberal Democratic Party (Japan)
List of political parties in Japan

Literature
 Ehrhardt, George, Axel Klein, Levi McLaughlin and Steven R. Reed (2014) (Eds.): Kōmeitō – Politics and Religion in Japan. Institute of East Asian Studies, University of California, Berkeley

Notes

References

External links
Komeito official website
Komeito official English website

1998 establishments in Japan
Buddhism in Japan
Buddhist democratic parties
Social conservative parties
Conservative parties in Japan
Centrist parties in Japan
Centre-right parties in Asia
Political parties established in 1998
Politics of Japan
Soka Gakkai